Jambai is a  village in Tirukkoyilur taluk in Kallakurichi district in the Indian state of Tamil Nadu. The major occupation of the people living at this place is agriculture and handloom. In 2011, it had a population of 2,000 people.

Etymology
Jambai got its name from Jambunatheshwarar temple, a Chola period (Shiva) temple. According to the inscriptions present inside the temple, this village was called as Valayur  during the Parantaka Chola I period. Hence, "Jambai" might be a later name to this village. This temple is situated at the banks of river Thenpenaiyaar, where much kora grass grew, the Tamil word for kora grass is sambu, hence the name Jambu and also there is an inherited old story that the elephant belonging to the king went there to dip itself in water, where it stumbled upon the Shivlinga, blood started oozing from the Shivlingam, hearing the call of the frightened elephant people started to gather and this incidence reached the ears of the king and then the temple was built. Jambu means elephant. As the Shivalingam was found by the elephant the village and temple were named after it.

Location
Jambai is located on the northern bank of the river, Thenpennai.

About the village
Jambai village has more-than-1000-year-old heritage. At Jambai, Saivism, Jainism, Buddhism and Saktism prevailed. In 2006, a beautifully carved 10th century A.D. Buddha sculpture was stolen from the middle of the fort area paddy field. There are two Siva temples, One Saptamatrika shrine, one Ayynar temple on the hill and other Ayyanar temple in north east corner of the village. Jain Tirthankara relief carving is seen in the hill on the way to Pallichandal. The importance of the village comes from the presence of the Shiva temple called Jambunatheshwarar temple and Jambaimalai containing 1st century CE Tamil Brahmi inscriptions, Jain abode, caves and beds.

Jambunatheshwarar Temple
 
In Tamil, this temple is called Thanthondreeswarar temple. This Shiva temple was built by Cholas during 10th century. The temple walls contain full of Tamil vattezhuttu inscriptions  of Cholas. This place was under Rashtrakuta rule during the mid-10th century, the  statues of Lord Muruga, Jyestha Devi, Kalabairavar, Durga belonging to Rashtrakuta architecture, are found inside the temple. Since the temple become very old and damaged, reconstruction works are carried by local people of Jambai now.

Jambaimalai

This is a small hillock in the north east of the village. Between a split area of this hillock there are signs of megalithic period settlement. The hillock contains a cavern called Dasimadam where Tamizhi inscriptions dated to 1st century CE is found. The epigraph is in Tamil (except for the title in Prakrit) and reads "Satiyaputo Atiyan Nedumaan Anjji itta Paali". In. The meaning of the epigraph may be rendered as "The abode (pali) given by (itta) Atiyan Nedumaan Anji (name), the Satyaputra (title)". Though the record is a short one in a single line, it throws valuable light on various aspects of South Indian history. The inscription clears the doubt about the identity of the Satyaputras, a dynasty of rulers, mentioned in Ashoka's inscriptions in the 3rd century BCE. Opposite to this cavern, another cave with four Jain stone beds have been found which confirms that Jambai was a Jain centre. West of this hillock in a small stone boulder, a 10th-century C.E. Tamil inscription of Kannaradeva or Krishna III, a Rashtrakuta king, found along with a relief work of Jyestha Devi. South of this inscription a lake for irrigation was constructed.

Pictures

See also
 Velirs
 Jainism
 Ennayiram
 Cholapandiyapuram

References

Archaeological sites in Tamil Nadu
Villages in Kallakurichi district
Jain temples in Tamil Nadu
Jain rock-cut architecture